Narrows Park is an unincorporated community in Allegany County, Maryland, United States. Braddock Run flows into Wills Creek near Narrows Park.

References

Unincorporated communities in Allegany County, Maryland
Unincorporated communities in Maryland